Água Branca, Paraíba is a municipality in the state of Paraíba in the Northeast Region of Brazil. It has a population of 10,306, as of 2020.

See also
List of municipalities in Paraíba

References

Municipalities in Paraíba